Polypleurum is a genus of flowering plants belonging to the family Podostemaceae.

Its native range is Tropical Asia.

Species:
 Polypleurum acuminatum Warm. 
 Polypleurum dichotomum (Gardner) J.B.Hall

References

Podostemaceae
Malpighiales genera